Belmont Hotel is a hotel in Missoula, Montana. Built in 1913, it was listed on the National Register of Historic Places in 1983.
 Notes on the University of Montana's collection of Belmont Hotel registers say "The Belmont Hotel was located at 430 North Higgins Avenue in Missoula, Montana, and was in business from 1911 to 1972. For the most part it operated as a railroad hotel, offering, for example, in 1927, services such as steam heat, electric light, telephone service, hot and cold-water baths, and reasonable rates by day or week. The establishment had numerous proprietors; however, Mrs. Lena Walker, a.k.a. Mrs. Lena Smith managed the hotel for most of the period of this (1918-1950) collection, from 1932 until 1956."

References

Further reading
Belmont Hotel Registers, Archives and Special Collections, Maureen and Mike Mansfield Library, The University of Montana-Missoula.
 http://nwda.orbiscascade.org/ark:/80444/xv23107

External links

Hotel buildings on the National Register of Historic Places in Montana
Hotel buildings completed in 1913
National Register of Historic Places in Missoula, Montana
1913 establishments in Montana